Bayantal, Bayantala, or Bayan Tala (Mongolian: rich steppe) may refer to:

Mongolia 
 Bayantal, Govisümber, a sum (district) in Govisümber Aimags (province)

China 
several Towns, Townships and Sums in different Banners (counties), Inner Mongolia

Other places 
 , in Bayantala Farm, Huade County, Ulanqab, Inner Mongolia

Russia
 , a ulus in Dzun-Khemchiksky District, Tuva